This article concerns the period 439 BC – 430 BC.

References